Holly Macve is an Ireland-born musician who performs as a solo artist.  She released her first album Golden Eagle on the Bella Union label in March 2017.  Her follow up album Not The Girl was released in May 2021.

Early life 
Macve was born in Ireland. Her mother Emily moved the family from Galway, Western Ireland to Yorkshire when Macve was a child.  Macve's Grandfather, Duncan Druce, was a classical composer and her mother a music therapist.  It was her mother's record collection which inspired the young Macve – from old blues to Bob Dylan – from these early influences she went on to discover the likes of  Leonard Cohen, Johnny Cash and Gillian Welch.  Macve started writing music at the age of 11, teaching herself guitar and piano.  At 16 Holly attended the Leeds College Of Music before moving to London aged 17.  It was here she signed her first publishing and management deal with Tileyard.

Music career
At 18, Macve moved south to Brighton where she began performing at local venues, working in a café whilst singing on open mic nights. Bella Union boss Simon Raymonde was a customer at the café, and having watched her perform, signed her to his label where she went on to record her first solo album Golden Eagle released in March 2017.

The bulk of Golden Eagle was recorded in Newcastle at the home studio of producer Paul Gregory (of Bella Union label-mates Lanterns on the Lake), with extra recording in Brighton and London. On its release, Macve was described by Record Collector as "an ethereal offspring of Nick Cave blessed with the stark musical backdrop of Johnny Cash's 'American' series of recordings."

Macve has worked and toured with artists as John Grant, Villagers, Benjamin Clementine, Bill Ryder-Jones, Fiona Brice, Tony Visconti Mercury Rev and Royal Northern Sinfonia.  Working with Northern Sinfonia also sparked Macve's interest in cinematic arrangements.

Macve has appeared at numerous music festivals including Glastonbury, End Of The Road, Latitude, and Electric Picnic.  Following her appearance at South by Southwest in Austin, Texas in 2017, Macve was labelled as one of the "top 12 notable acts" by The New York Times. Bob Boilen of NPR Music described Macve as "the best voice I heard at SXSW".

For the 2021 album Not The Girl, Macve co-produced tracks with band member Max Kinghorn-Mills. Not The Girl was mixed by Collin Dupuis, who worked on Lana Del Rey’s Ultraviolence and whom Macve considers a significant musical influence. In a recent interview with Rolling Stone, Del Ray was quoted as saying Macve would be the ideal person to play her in a biopic.

Among the notable contributors to Not The Girl are Fiona Brice supplying string arrangements and CJ Hillman on pedal steel.

References 

Irish musicians
1995 births
Living people